Odidimode Rogbeesin  was the 11th Ooni of Ife, a paramount traditional ruler of Ile Ife, the ancestral home of the Yorubas. He succeeded Ooni Lafogido and was succeeded by  
Ooni Aworokolokin.

References

Oonis of Ife
Yoruba history